The Coupe de France 1982–83 was its 66th edition. It was won by Paris SG which defeated FC Nantes in the Final.

Round of 16

Quarter-finals

Semi-finals
First round

Second round

Final

References

French federation

1982–83 domestic association football cups
1982–83 in French football
1982-83